The 1933 Rotherham by-election was held on 27 February 1933.  The by-election was held due to the resignation of the incumbent Conservative MP, George Herbert (politician).  It was won by the Labour candidate William Dobbie.

References

1933 in England
Elections in Rotherham
1933 elections in the United Kingdom
By-elections to the Parliament of the United Kingdom in South Yorkshire constituencies
1930s in Yorkshire